SMS Meteor may refer to one of the following ships:

 , a gunboat of the Imperial German Navy
 , an Austrian-Hungarian torpedo boat
 , an aviso
 , a converted merchant ship which saw service during the First World War
 , a planned gunboat, completed instead as a survey ship

 

German Navy ship names